Corran Point Lighthouse is an active lighthouse located at Corran Point on the west side of the Narrows of Loch Linnhe, in Lochaber, Highland, Scotland. It was built in 1860 as a project by Thomas Stevenson and David Stevenson; it is a masonry tower with gallery, lantern and keeper's house which has become private property. The lighthouse emits an isophase light white, red or green according to the directions and was the first lighthouse to be automated in 1898.

See also
 List of lighthouses in Scotland
 List of Northern Lighthouse Board lighthouses

References

External links

 Northern Lighthouse Board

Lighthouses in Scotland
Lighthouses completed in 1860
1860 establishments in Scotland